Norval MacGregor (April 3, 1862 – November 21, 1933) was an American producer, director, and actor in silent films and theater. He directed some 88 films, acted in 13, and produced many others.

He was a native of River Falls, Wisconsin.

He was on officer of the Motion Picture Directors Association, served as its treasurer, and in 1919 was on the reception committee for the Motion Picture Directors ball.

The University of Washington Libraries have a photo of him.

Selected filmography

Producer
Jimmmie the Porter (1914) by Edwin Ray Coffin
The Jungle Samaritan (1914)
Low Financier (1914)
Newsboy Tenor (1914)
Harbor of Love (1914)
Muff (1914)
Oh! Look Who's Here! (1914)
Tonsorial Leopard Tamer (1914)
You Can Never Tell (1914)
At the Transfer Corner (1914)
Cupid Turns the Tables (1914)
Mysterious Black Box (1914)
No Wedding Bells for Her (1914)
Surprise Party (1914)

Director
One Hundred Years of Mormonism (1913)
The Awful Adventures of An Aviator (1915)
Colorado (1915 film)
Baseball at Mudville (1917) 
Children of Banishment (1919)

Actor
The Spoilers (1914) 
The White Scar (1915) as Mackintosh
The Spirit of '76 (1917)
The Light of Victory (1919)
The Mutiny of the Elsinore (1920) as Captain Nathaniel Somers 
A Motion to Adjourn (1921) as Doc Bleeker
Chain Lightning (1922) as Major Lee Pomeroy
Courtship of Miles Standish (1923) as William Bradford
The Face on the Bar-Room Floor (1923)
Stepping Lively (1924) as James Pendroy 
The Bowery Bishop (1924) as Mr. Kindly 
Phantom Justice (1924) as Wolfe

References

1862 births
1933 deaths
Silent film directors
American male silent film actors
20th-century American male actors
American film producers
American male stage actors
Film directors from Wisconsin
19th-century American actors
20th-century American actors
People from River Falls, Wisconsin